The 2014–15 Sporting de Gijón season was the third season that the club will play in Segunda División after the relegation from the highest tier of football in Spain, La Liga. Sporting finished as runner-up and promoted to the top tier.

Season overview

Preseason
Despite not promoting to La Liga, head coach Abelardo Fernández extended his contract for two seasons. Sporting started the preseason on July 17 and played nine friendly games, two of them in a 45-minute game format.

On July 22, Carlos Carmona extended his contract until 2019. One day later, Sporting finished its first friendly defeating Marino de Luanco by 1–0 in a game without new signings and several players of the reserve team.

Preseason ended with a no-goals draw with Getafe in the Trofeo Villa de Gijón. Finally, Sporting won its tournament six years later.

August
As in the previous season, the club started the league earning the three points. At Soria, Sporting went back from a goal against thank to the goals of Miguel Ángel Guerrero and Juan Muñiz. The club continued its good start debuting in El Molinón with a new win by 2–1 over Ponferradina.

September
On September 1, striker Stefan Šćepović signed a four-year deal with Celtic for £2.3 million, having turned down a move the day before. In the same press release confirming the transfer, Sporting announced Julio and Carlos Castro would be promoted to the first team. The club was the only professional team in Spain which did not sign any new player in the Summer window transfer.

In the first game of the month, at Albacete, a header in the 93rd minute of Pablo Pérez served to save one point and to remain unbeaten in the league prior to the game at El Molinón versus Girona, which won its three first games. The Catalan team equalized the game in the last minute with a goal of David Juncà.

Previously, on September 10, Sporting was defeated by Real Valladolid by 1–3 in the second round of the Copa del Rey and subsequently eliminated.

In the two next games, Pablo Pérez netted two goals to beat Mirandés at Anduva and a header of Miguel Ángel Guerrero equalized the game versus Valladolid, allowing Sporting to finish the month of September becoming the only undefeated team in Segunda División.

October
On October 6, Abelardo was named Coach of the Month by the LFP. Sporting remained as the only unbeaten team in the league achieving two more home wins and two draws away, finishing the month in the third position.

November
On November 22, Abelardo's team beat the record of Vujadin Boškov in the club and remained unbeaten for the 14th game in a row, after a no-goal draw at El Molinón versus Llagostera. In the next game, at Mallorca, Sporting beat this record and tied the longest unbeaten streak since the start of the season.

January
On January 18, Sporting lost its first league game after a streak of 20 games unbeaten. Despite a goal of Juan Muñiz in the 6th minute, Betis scored twice in the second half and won by 1–2 at El Molinón. With this loss, the team finished the first half of the league in the fifth position with 38 points.

June
Sporting finally promoted on June 7, after beating widely Betis by 0–3 and after the draw of Girona versus Lugo at Montilivi.

Players

Current squad

Reserve team players

In

Out

Technical staff

Competitions

Preseason and friendlies

Segunda División

League table

Results summary

Positions by round

Matches

Copa del Rey

Statistics

Appearances and goals

Disciplinary record

See also
2014–15 Segunda División
2014–15 Copa del Rey

References

Sporting de Gijón seasons
Sporting de Gijon